Pama is a town located in the province of Kompienga in Burkina Faso. It is the capital of Kompienga Province.

References 

Populated places in the Est Region (Burkina Faso)